Keenleyside or Keenlyside is a surname that may refer to:
Keenleyside Hill, Nr Alston, Cumbria, United Kingdom. Fallen out of common usage due to change of ownership of hill. Can still be found by google maps.
Eric Keenleyside, (b. 1957), Canadian actor
George Keenlyside (1889–1967), English footballer
Hugh Llewellyn Keenleyside, CC (1898–1992), Canadian professor, diplomat and civil servant 
for whom the Keenleyside Dam is named
Huong Keenleyside, (née Nguyen), (b. 1971), Vietnamese writer
Sir Simon Keenlyside, (b. 1959), British opera singer
Zenaida, Lady Keenlyside, ballet dancer, married to Sir Simon Keenlyside
Tom Keenlyside, (b. 1950), Canadian musician